Piccardo is an Italian surname, a version of Picard, meaning a person from Picardy, a historical region and cultural area of France. It is found primarily in Liguria.

Piccardo family 

The Piccardo family is an ancient Italian family, from Liguria. In the 19th century a family branch relocated from Voltri, in the Kingdom of Sardinia, to Monte San Giovanni Campano, in the Papal States.  A branch of the family also settled in the Eastern North America, according to genealogical organisation House of Names.

They were famous entrepreneurs in the paper industry of the region Liguria and in Southern Lazio.

References 

 Giovanni Vezzelli, Cognomi romagnoli di origine barbarico-germanica, Sodalizio, 1988
 Emidio De Felice, Dizionario dei cognomi italiani, Milano, Mondadori, 1997
 Gianmario Raimondi, Luisa Ravelli, Elena Papa, L'antroponomastica: elementi di metodo, Libreria stampatori, 2005

Piccardo family:

 Associazione italiana degli editori e negozianti di musica, Associazione editoriale-libraria italiana, Associazione editoriale-libraria italiana, Associazione italiana degli editori e negozianti di musica, Giornale della libreria, della tipografia, e delle arti ed industrie affini (Sezione 5 - Piccardo, Luigi Brunelli, Provincia di Caserta), 1888
 Benn Business Information Services, Ernest Benn Limited, Phillips Paper Trade Directory, 1980
 Sociologia: rivista di studi sociali, Istituto "Luigi Sturzo", Nuova ser., anno 24, n. 2–3, published in 1990

See also
Pickard
Picard (disambiguation)
Piccard
Picardo (disambiguation)

Surnames
Families of Liguria
Roman Catholic families